Michael Benedicks, born 1949, is a Professor of  Mathematics at the Royal Institute of Technology (KTH) in Stockholm, Sweden.

He received his Ph.D. from the Royal Institute of Technology in 1980. His doctoral advisor was Professor Harold S. Shapiro. He was a visiting scholar at the Institute for Advanced Study in the summer of 1989.
He became a Professor of Mathematics at the Royal Institute of Technology in 1991.

His research interests include dynamic systems. For example, he has studied Hénon maps together with Professor Lennart Carleson.

He became a member of the Royal Swedish Academy of Sciences in 2007.

References

External links 
Prof. Benedicks's website

1949 births
Swedish mathematicians
Living people
Academic staff of the KTH Royal Institute of Technology
KTH Royal Institute of Technology alumni
Members of the Royal Swedish Academy of Sciences
Institute for Advanced Study visiting scholars